The 16th Genie Awards were held on January 14, 1996, to honour films released in 1995. The ceremony took place in Montreal at Société Radio-Canada's Studio 42.

For the first time, the ceremony was not broadcast live on any television network, instead taking place in the afternoon of January 14; separate post-award specials aired in prime time to publicize the award highlights. The English special on CBC Television was hosted by Mary Walsh, while the French special on Radio-Canada was hosted by actor Pascale Bussières and broadcaster René Homier-Roy.

It was the first of two Genie Award ceremonies held in 1996. Normally the 16th Genie Award ceremony would have been held in the late fall of 1995, but it was delayed until early 1996. The 17th Genie Awards were held in November 1996, returning to the traditional scheduling of the award ceremony. Beginning with the 19th Genie Awards in 1999, however, the award scheduling returned to the winter again, and has remained scheduled as such ever since.

Nominees and winners
The Genie Award winner in each category is shown in bold text.

References

External links 
 

16
Genie
Genie